Edward Greville may refer to:
Edward Greville (Australian politician), member of the New South Wales Legislative Assembly
Sir Edward Greville (died 1559), High Sheriff of Warwickshire
Sir Edward Greville (died 1634), English nobleman and member of parliament